Merrifieldia baliodactylus, also known as the dingy white plume, is a moth of the family Pterophoridae found in most of Europe.  It was first described by the German entomologist, Philipp Christoph Zeller in 1841.

Adults are on wing from July to August in one generation in western Europe.

The larvae feed on Oregano (Origanum vulgare), biting through the stem and causing the upper leaves to wilt.

References

baliodactylus
Moths described in 1841
Plume moths of Europe
Taxa named by Philipp Christoph Zeller